Marlies Anne van Baalen (born 30 August 1980 in Den Bosch, North Brabant) is a Dutch Dressage equestrian. She is Coby van Baalen's daughter.

Van Baalen represented the Netherlands at the 2004 Summer Olympics where she finished in 43rd position in the individual rankings. With the Dutch dressage team, in which she featured with Anky van Grunsven, Sven Rothenberger and Imke Bartels, she finished just outside the medal spots with the fourth place.

She was the first reserve for the Dutch team during the European Championships in Rotterdam 2011. In 2021, she represented The Netherlands at the Olympic Games in Tokyo with her horse Go Legend, finishing 20th in both Grand Prix and Grand Prix Special.

External links
Van Baalen at the Dutch Olympic Archive

References 

Dutch dressage riders
1980 births
Living people
Olympic equestrians of the Netherlands
Dutch female equestrians
Equestrians at the 2004 Summer Olympics
Equestrians at the 2020 Summer Olympics
Sportspeople from 's-Hertogenbosch
21st-century Dutch women